Fernando Joanes de Monroy, 12th century Lord of Allariz, was a Spanish nobleman. He was an important Knight at the court of King Alfonso VII of León and Castile.

He was married to Núñez de Guzmán, daughter of the Count Gómez Nuñez de Guzmán Maldonado and Elvira Pérez. A son, Pedro Fernandez de Monroy was founder of the house Monroy. His grandson Fernán Pérez de Monroy, known as Gallego for having married a lady of Galicia, Elvira Nunez de Andrade, daughter of an illustrious family of ancestors Goths.

References

External links
 Profile, perso.wanadoo.es ; accessed 3 March 2015.

12th-century nobility from León and Castile
Lords of Spain
Date of birth unknown
Date of death unknown
Place of birth unknown
Place of death unknown